Spiradoline (U-62066) is a drug which acts as a highly selective κ-opioid agonist. It has analgesic, diuretic, and antitussive effects, and produces subjective effects in animals similar to those of ketazocine and alazocine. The main effect in humans is sedation, along with analgesic and diuretic effects, but significant side effects such as dysphoria and hallucinations have stopped it from being used clinically.

See also 
 Enadoline

References 

Dissociative drugs
Chloroarenes
Acetamides
Pyrrolidines
Kappa-opioid receptor agonists